Zarjabad Rural District is in Firuz District of Kowsar County, Ardabil province, Iran. At the census of 2006, its population was 3,587 in 776 households; there were 3,131 inhabitants in 850 households at the following census of 2011; and in the most recent census of 2016, the population of the rural district was 2,233 in 698 households. The largest of its 13 villages was Zarjabad, with 778 people.

References 

Kowsar County

Rural Districts of Ardabil Province

Populated places in Ardabil Province

Populated places in Kowsar County